George Bull was an English bishop and theologian.

George Bull may also refer to:

People
George Bull (journalist) (1929–2001), English translator, author and journalist
Sir George Bull, 3rd Baronet (1906–1986), of the Bull baronets
George Stringer Bull (1799–1865), English cleric and activist
George Bull (priest), Dean of Connor
George Bull (business) (born 1936), last chairman of Grand Metropolitan, founding joint chairman of Diageo, and first non-family chairman of Sainsbury's

Characters
Sir George Bull, fictional character in the novels of Milward Kennedy
Dr. George Bull, protagonist in Doctor Bull

See also

George Ball (disambiguation)
Bull (surname)